The Association of Tennis Professionals (ATP) Tour is the elite tour for professional tennis organized by the ATP. The ATP Tour includes the Grand Slam tournaments (organized by the International Tennis Federation (ITF)), the ATP Championship Series, Single-Week, the ATP Championship Series, the ATP World Series, the ATP World Team Cup, the Davis Cup (organized by the ITF), the ATP Tour World Championships and the Grand Slam Cup (organized by the ITF).

Schedule 
This is the complete schedule of events on the 1994 IBM ATP Tour, with player progression documented from the quarterfinals stage.

Key

January

February

March

April

May

June

July

August

September

October

November

December

ATP rankings

Statistical information 
List of players and singles titles won:
 Andre Agassi – Scottsdale, Canada Masters, US Open, Vienna, Paris Masters (5)
 Jeremy Bates – Seoul (1)
 Boris Becker – Milan, Los Angeles, New Haven, Stockholm Masters (4)
 Alberto Berasategui – Nice, Stuttgart Outdoors, Umag, Palermo, Athens, Santiago, Montevideo (7)
 Sergi Bruguera – French Open, Gstaad, Prague (3)
 Michael Chang – Jakarta, Philadelphia, Hong Kong, Atlanta, Cincinnati Masters, Beijing (6)
 Àlex Corretja – Buenos Aires (1)
 Carlos Costa – Estoril, San Marino (2)
 Franco Davín – Bucharest (1)
 Stefan Edberg – Doha, Stuttgart Indoor, Washington, D.C. (3)
 Jacco Eltingh – Schenectady, Kuala Lumpur (2)
 Wayne Ferreira – Oahu, Indianapolis, Bordeaux, Basel, Tel Aviv (5)
 Marcelo Filippini – Florence (1)
 Renzo Furlan – San Jose, Casablanca (2)
 Magnus Gustafsson – Auckland, Dubai (2)
 Goran Ivanišević – Kitzbühel, Tokyo Indoor (2)
 Yevgeny Kafelnikov – Adelaide, Copenhagen, Long Island (3)
 Bernd Karbacher – Båstad (1)
 Richard Krajicek – Barcelona, Rosmalen, Sydney Indoors (3)
 Magnus Larsson – Zaragoza, Toulouse (2)
 Todd Martin – Memphis, London (2)
 Luiz Mattar – Coral Springs (1)
 Andrei Medvedev – Monte Carlo Masters, Hamburg Masters (2)
 Thomas Muster – Mexico City, Madrid, St. Poelten (3)
 Karel Nováček – Hilversum (1)
 Jared Palmer – Pinehurst (1)
 Nicolás Pereira – Bogotá (1)
 Patrick Rafter – Manchester (1)
 Marc Rosset – Marseille, Lyon (2)
 Pete Sampras – Sydney, Australian Open, Indian Wells Masters, Miami Masters, Osaka, Tokyo Outdoors, Rome Masters, Wimbledon, Antwerp, ATP World Championships (10)
 Javier Sánchez – Bologna (1)
 Michael Stich – Rotterdam, Munich, Halle (3)
 Jason Stoltenberg – Birmingham (1)
 Alexander Volkov – Moscow (1)
 MaliVai Washington – Ostrava (1)
 David Wheaton – Newport (1)
 Markus Zoecke – Sun City (1)

The following players won their first title:
 Jeremy Bates
 Àlex Corretja
 Renzo Furlan
 Yevgeny Kafelnikov
 Jared Palmer
 Nicolás Pereira
 Patrick Rafter
 Markus Zoecke

See also 
 1994 WTA Tour

References 

 
ATP Tour
ATP Tour seasons